Kepler-277c (also known by its Kepler Objects of Interest designation KOI-1215.02) is the third most massive and second-largest rocky planet ever discovered, with a mass about 64 times that of Earth. Discovered in 2014 by the Kepler Space Telescope, Kepler-277c is a Neptune-sized exoplanet with a very high mass and density for an object of its radius, suggesting a composition made mainly of rock with some amounts of water. Along with its sister planet, Kepler-277b, the planet's mass was determined using transit-timing variations (TTVs).

Characteristics

Size and temperature
Kepler-277c was detected using the transit method and TTVs, allowing for both its mass and radius to be determined to some level. It is approximately 3.36 , close to the size of Neptune. At that radius, most planets should be gaseous Mini-Neptunes with no solid surface. However, the mass of Kepler-277c is extremely high for its size. Transit-timing variations indicate a planetary mass of about 64.2 , close to Saturn's mass at 95.16 . The planet has a density of approximately 9.33 g/cm3 and about 5.7 times the surface gravity of Earth. Such a high density for an object of this size implies that, like its sister planet, Kepler-277c is an enormous rock-based planet with a small portion of its mass as water. It is currently the third most massive and second largest terrestrial planet ever discovered, behind Kepler-277b in mass and PSR J1719-1438 b in both radius and mass.

Orbit
Kepler-277c orbits close to its host star, with one orbit lasting 33.006 days. Its semi-major axis, or average distance from the parent object, is about 0.209 AU. For comparison, the planet Mercury takes 88 days to orbit the Sun at a distance of 0.38 AU. At this distance, Kepler-277c is very hot and most likely tidally locked to its host star. It is close to a 2:1 resonance with Kepler-277b, which orbits at an average distance of about 0.136 AU.

Host star
The parent star Kepler-277 is a large yellow star. It is 1.69  and 1.12 , with a temperature of 5946 K, a metallicity of -0.315 [Fe/H], and an unknown age. For comparison, the Sun has a temperature of 5778 K, a metallicity of 0.00 [Fe/H], and an age of about 4.5 billion years. The large radius in comparison to its mass and temperature suggest that Kepler-277 could be a Subgiant star.

See also
Mega-Earth
Kepler-277b

References

Exoplanets discovered in 2014
Transiting exoplanets
Exoplanets discovered by the Kepler space telescope
Lyra (constellation)
Mega-Earths